Channarong Promsrikaew (born 17 April 2001) is a Thai professional footballer who plays as an attacking midfielder or winger for Chonburi and the Thailand national team.

Club career

Chonburi
Channarong learned to play football in the youth team of the first division club Chonburi FC in Chonburi. Until the end of 2018 he was mainly used in the B team. The B-Team played in the fourth division, the Thai League 4, in the Eastern region. In 2018 he was used as a youth player four times in the first team. The first team played in the first division, the Thai League 1. In 2019 he also signed his first professional contract here. He was used three times in the first division in the 2019 season. From January 2020 to June 2020 he was loaned to the third division club Banbueng, which is also based in Chonburi. He returned to Chonburi FC in July.

Unión Adarve (loan)
On 27 July 2021 Channarong moved to Spain on loan to the fourth division club Unión Adarve in Madrid.

International career
On 26 May 2022, Promsrikaew was called up to the Thailand under-23 for the 2022 AFC U-23 Asian Cup.

International goals

Senior

Under-23
Scores and results list Thailand's goal tally first.

Under-19

Personal Life 
Channarong practices Christian.

Honours
Chonburi
 Thai FA Cup : Runner-up 2020–21

International
Thailand
 AFF Championship: 2022

Individual
Thai League 1 Goal of the Month: September 2022

References

External links
 
 

2001 births
Living people
Channarong Promsrikaew
Channarong Promsrikaew
Channarong Promsrikaew
Association football midfielders
Channarong Promsrikaew
Channarong Promsrikaew
Channarong Promsrikaew
Channarong Promsrikaew
Channarong Promsrikaew